The American Society of Heating, Refrigerating and Air-Conditioning Engineers (ASHRAE  ) is an American professional association seeking to advance heating, ventilation, air conditioning and refrigeration (HVAC&R) systems design and construction. ASHRAE has over 50,000 members in more than 130 countries worldwide. 

ASHRAE's members are composed of building services engineers, architects, mechanical contractors, building owners, equipment manufacturers' employees, and others concerned with the design and construction of HVAC&R systems in buildings. The society funds research projects, offers continuing education programs, and develops and publishes technical standards to improve building services engineering, energy efficiency, indoor air quality, and sustainable development.

History
ASHRAE was founded in 1894 at a meeting of engineers in New York City, formerly headquartered at 345 East 47th Street, and has held an annual meeting since 1895. Until 1954 it was known as the American Society of Heating and Ventilating Engineers (ASHVE); in that year it changed its name to the American Society of Heating and Air-Conditioning Engineers (ASHAE). Its current name and organization came from the 1959 merger of ASHAE and the American Society of Refrigerating Engineers (ASRE).

Despite having 'American' in its name, ASHRAE is a global organization, holding international events. In 2012, it rebranded itself with a new logo and tagline: "Shaping Tomorrow's Built Environment Today".

2020 Coronavirus advice

Lawrence J. Schoen argued in the ASHRAE Journal Newsletter of 24 March 2020 that, because of the WHO guidance:

it was the duty of ASHRAE members to
 Increase disinfection of frequently touched surfaces.
 Install more hand sanitation dispensers, assuming they can be procured.
 Supervise or shut down food preparation and warming areas, including the office pantry and coffee station.
 Close or post warning signs at water fountains in favor of bottle filling stations and sinks, or even better, encourage employees to bring their water from home.

In light of the OSHA Guidance on Preparing Workplaces for COVID-19 that "non-health care workplaces fall into the medium and lower exposure risk categories", and absent a clear WHO directive, only after running through the checklist mentioned above should they tackle the HVAC vector. He acknowledged that in at least one non peer-reviewed paper detectable levels of the SARS-CoV-2 virus RNA were found to be transmitted by aerodynamic suspension in toilets and ICUs but decided to make this revelation of secondary importance in his own Guidance.

Further discussion of this topic can be found in a National Post article by Tom Blackwell dated 26 April 2020. Blackwell mentions the CIHR-funded study of Brian Fleck, who observes that Legionnaires' disease is known to be spread by buildings. Blackwell repeats the warning of Morawska and Cao, who strongly believe:

The research article entitled COVID-19 Outbreak Associated with Air Conditioning in Restaurant, Guangzhou, China, 2020 was also mentioned by Blackwell in support of his hypothesis; and on 27 April 2020, the journal Nature published an article entitled Aerodynamic analysis of SARS-CoV-2 in two Wuhan hospitals in which air flow in poorly ventilated areas such as indoor toilets were possibly to blame for the persistence of the harm to society.

Publications
The ASHRAE Handbook is a four-volume resource for HVAC&R technology and is available in both print and electronic versions. The volumes are Fundamentals, HVAC Applications, HVAC Systems and Equipment, and Refrigeration. One of the four volumes is updated each year.

ASHRAE also publishes a set of standards and guidelines relating to HVAC systems and issues, that are often referenced in building codes and used by consulting engineers, mechanical contractors, architects, and government agencies. These standards are periodically reviewed, revised and republished.

Examples of some ASHRAE Standards are:
 Standard 34 – Designation and Safety Classification of Refrigerants
 Standard 55 – Thermal Environmental Conditions for Human Occupancy
 Standard 62.1 – Ventilation for Acceptable Indoor Air Quality (versions: 2001 and earlier as "62", 2004 and beyond as "62.1")
 Standard 62.2 – Ventilation and Acceptable Indoor Air Quality in Low-Rise Residential Buildings
 Standard 90.1 – Energy Standard for Buildings Except Low-Rise Residential Buildings – The IESNA is a joint sponsor of this standard.
 Standard 135 – BACnet - A Data Communication Protocol for Building Automation and Control Networks
 Standard 189.1 – Standard for the Design of High Performance, Green Buildings Except Low-Rise Residential Buildings

The society also publishes two magazines: the ASHRAE Journal is issued monthly, and High Performing Buildings Magazine is published quarterly. They contain articles on related technology, information on upcoming meetings, editorials, and case studies of various well-performing buildings.

ASHRAE also publishes books, ASHRAE Transactions, and the International Journal of HVAC&R Research.

Legislation
ASHRAE supported the Streamlining Energy Efficiency for Schools Act of 2014 (H.R. 4092; 113th Congress), a bill that would require the United States Department of Energy to establish a centralized clearinghouse to disseminate information on federal programs, incentives, and mechanisms for financing energy-efficient retrofits and upgrades at schools.

Society awards
ASHRAE offers six categories of awards: achievement awards to recognize personal honors; personal awards for general and specific society activities; paper awards; society awards for groups or chapters; chapters and regional awards.

ASHRAE Fellows
ASHRAE Fellow is a Membership Grade of Distinction conferred by The College of Fellows of ASHRAE, Inc. to an ASHRAE member with significant publications or innovations and distinguished scientific and engineering background in the fields of heating, refrigeration, air conditioning, ventilation. The ASHRAE Fellow membership grade is the highest elected grade in ASHRAE.

Headquarters renewal
To demonstrate the Society's commitment to sustainability, ASHRAE renovated its previous headquarters building in Atlanta, Ga. After the renovation and occupancy in June 2008, the building received many awards, including an Energy Star rating with a score of 95, a Platinum Certification from USGBC's LEED program, and four Green Globes from the Green Building Initiative. The current site energy use intensity (EUI) is 35.8 kBtu/Sqft (411 MJ/m2), a 60 percent reduction from the pre-renovation value. The renovation included the use of a dedicated outdoor air supply (DOAS) system with energy recovery and humidity control; a ground-source heat pump system (GSHP); and variable refrigerant flow systems with heat recovery. The building also serves as a live case study. A web-based user interface allowed researchers around the world to extract data from the building to study factors such as energy use and electric power demand, water consumption and indoor air quality.

In moving its world headquarters from Atlanta to the Atlanta suburb of Peachtree Corners the society plans to spend $15.7 million to retrofit an existing building so that its energy consumption is reduced to net-zero and so that it will become a showcase for the latest HVAC&R equipment and technology.

See also
 ASHRAE 90.1
 ASHRAE 55
 ASHRAE Handbook
 Building services engineering
 Chartered Institution of Building Services Engineers
 Chartered Association of Building Engineers
 Ralph G. Nevins
 Sick building syndrome
 Uniform Codes
 Uniform Mechanical Code

References

External links
 
 ASHRAE publications
 The AHR Expo - Co-Sponsored by ASHRAE and ARI
 ASHRAE Building Energy Quotient Program

 
American engineering organizations
Construction industry of the United States
Heating, ventilation, and air conditioning